Pristimantis muricatus is a species of frog in the family Strabomantidae.
It is endemic to Ecuador.
Its natural habitats are tropical moist lowland forests and moist montane forests.
It is threatened by habitat loss.

References

muricatus
Amphibians of Ecuador
Endemic fauna of Ecuador
Amphibians described in 1980
Taxonomy articles created by Polbot